Avernum 2: Crystal Souls is a single-player role-playing video game developed by Spiderweb Software. It is the second game in the Avernum trilogy. The game was released for OS X and Microsoft Windows in January 2015, The iPad version was released on the App Store on April 15, 2015.

Avernum 2 was released simultaneously on Steam, GOG.com, and the web site of Spiderweb Software.

Setting
The Avernum series is based in Avernum, a subterranean nation far under the surface of the world. The surface is ruled by the Empire, a single, monolithic power under the command of the cruel Emperor Hawthorne.

For many years, everyone who spoke out, who misbehaved or didn't fit in was cast into the dark, volcanic pits of Avernum, far below the surface. There, the exiles survived, gained power, and struck back. They assassinated the lord of the Empire.

As Avernum 2 begins, the Empire has begun to take revenge. They have invaded Avernum, taking cave after cave and killing everyone they meet. If the player cannot find a way to stop them quickly, Avernum is doomed.

Gameplay

Avernum 2: Crystal Souls is a single-player role-playing video game. The player controls a group of up to four adventurers, who can use melee weapons, missile weapons, magic, or a mix of these skills to defeat opponents.

The game system in Avernum 2 is skill based. Players choose a character class at the beginning of the game, but this only determines the character's starting skills. The player is then free to train the character in 28 different skills, ranging from Melee Weapons to Arcane Lore to First Aid.

Characters in Avernum have access to over 60 different spells and battle disciplines. These can be spells to inflict damage or summon aid, blessings and curses, and rituals that heal wounded party members. Avernum 2 features elaborate scripted encounters that are intended to encourage a variety of tactics.

Avernum 2 features a large world and freedom in what areas to explore and when. There are three main game-winning quests. Players can attempt one or all three. Thus, it is not necessary to invest a huge amount of time to attain a satisfying ending to the game. Game quests can be completed in almost any order.

Combat in Avernum 2 is turn-based. Creatures in battle take turns acting, during which they can move, use abilities, and attack.

Reception 

Avernum 2 received "generally favorable" reviews, according to review aggregator Metacritic.

RPGamer gave the game 3.5 out of 5, writing, "Avernum 2 involved a lot of backtracking, and plenty of hunting around with the mouse cursor for just the right spot to produce a reaction. Yet the time was spent exploring a mammoth and intriguing world, slaughtering plenty of its nasty inhabitants, and enjoying the journey. This is not the sort of game that can easily be recommended to a mass audience, but for a certain group of players it definitely delivers an experience worth having". TouchArcade gave the game 4.5 stars out of 5 and noted that the iPad version of the game had a better control scheme than the PC version.

References

External links
Avernum 2: Crystal Souls official site
Avernum 2 on Steam

2015 video games
Fantasy video games
IOS games
MacOS games
Role-playing video games
Spiderweb Software games
Video game remakes
Video games developed in the United States
Video games with isometric graphics
Windows games
Single-player video games